Leticia Ribeiro N. Dos Santos (born February 24, 1979 in Rio de Janeiro, Brazil) is a 4th degree Brazilian jiu-jitsu black belt and multiple time world champion in the sport. She is associated with the Gracie Humaita jiu-jitsu school. Ribeiro is considered one of the top 10 best Brazilian jiu-jitsu female fighters of all time having been distinguished with a mention in the IBJJF Hall of Fame.

Biography 

Leticia Ribeiro began training in Brazilian jiu-jitsu in 1995 at the Gracie Tijuca Academy originally under Marcelo Machado a student of Royler Gracie and the Gracie Humaita school. She initially began training for esthetic reasons but quickly fell in love with the art and began training more seriously. At the time the Gracie Tijuca Academy had the reigning national women's championship team in Brazil.

She has won numerous jiu-jitsu national and world championships during the course of her career. Originally starting with the Gracie Tijuca Academy. Ribeiro began training under her original instructor Royler Gracie eventually earning her black belt under Gracie. In addition to Gracie, Leticia also trains with Vinicius Aieta, Saulo Ribeiro, Xande Ribeiro and others black belts from Gracie Humaita team.

Ribeiro is currently a 4th degree black belt in Brazilian jiu-jitsu under Royler Gracie and represents the Gracie Humaita team in jiu-jitsu competitions.  She's presently an instructor at Gracie Humaita Southbay Competition Team, teaching Gi and No-Gi Brazilian jiu-jitsu classes, head coach of the Gracie Humaita Female Team and trainer of the World Champion Beatriz Mesquita.

Personal life 
Ribeiro  resides in San Diego, California and is bilingual in English and Portuguese. Her long term partner is MMA fighter Fabrício Camões.

Media appearances 
In the fourth episode of season 3 of Wildboyz in 2006; Steve-O and Chris Pontius visit Brazil and attend the Gracie Humaita jiu-jitsu school in Rio de Janeiro. Royler Gracie takes on Chris Pontius and chokes him out, while Leticia defeats Steve-O via armbar submission.

Titles 
 2014 World Brazilian jiu-jitsu Championships – Women's Black Belt Light Featherweight 3rd Place
 2012 World Brazilian jiu-jitsu Championships – Women's Black Belt Light Featherweight 1st Place
 2011 World Brazilian jiu-jitsu Championships – Women's Black Belt Light Featherweight 1st Place
 2011 European Brazilian jiu-jitsu Championships – Women's Black Belt Featherweight 3rd Place
 2010 World Brazilian jiu-jitsu No-Gi Championships – Women's Black Belt Super Featherweight 1st Place
 2010 World Brazilian jiu-jitsu Championships – Women's Black Belt Light Featherweight 1st Place
 2009 World Brazilian jiu-jitsu Championships – Women's Black Belt Light Featherweight 1st Place
 2009 World Brazilian jiu-jitsu No-Gi Championships – Women's Black Belt Super Featherweight 2nd Place
 2008 World Brazilian jiu-jitsu Championships – Women's Black Belt Featherweight 3rd Place
 2008 World Brazilian jiu-jitsu No-Gi Championships – Women's Black Belt Super Featherweight 1st Place
 2007 World Brazilian jiu-jitsu Championships – Women's Black Belt Featherweight 3rd Place
 2006 World Cup Brazilian jiu-jitsu Championships – Women's Black Belt Featherweight 1st Place
 2006 World Brazilian jiu-jitsu Championships – Women's Black Belt Featherweight 1st Place
 2005 World Brazilian jiu-jitsu Championships – Women's Black Belt Featherweight 2nd Place
 2005 Rio de Janeiro State Jiu-Jitsu Championships – Women's Black Belt Featherweight 1st Place
 2005 Pan American Jiu-Jitsu Championships – Women's Black Belt Feather 1st Place
 2005 European Brazilian jiu-jitsu Championships – Women's Black Belt Featherweight 1st Place
 Challenge 2 – Brazil x Japan – Superfight Champion
 2005 World Cup Brazilian jiu-jitsu Championships – Women's Black Belt Featherweight 1st Place
 2004 Rio de Janeiro State Jiu-Jitsu Championships – Women's Black Belt Featherweight 1st Place
 2004 Pan American Jiu-Jitsu Championships – Women's Black Belt Feather 1st Place
 2003 World Brazilian jiu-jitsu Championships – Women's Black Belt Featherweight 3rd Place
 2003 World Cup Brazilian jiu-jitsu Championships – Women's Black Belt Featherweight 1st Place
 2003 Pan American Jiu-Jitsu Championships – Women's Black Belt Featherweight 1st Place
 2003 Brazilian National Cup Jiu-Jitsu Championships – Women's Black Belt Featherweight 1st Place
 2003 Third Black Belt Challenge – Superfight Champion
 2002 World Brazilian jiu-jitsu Championships – Women's Black Belt Featherweight 1st Place
 2002 Brazilian National Jiu-Jitsu Championships – Women's Black Belt Featherweight 2nd Place
 2001 World Brazilian jiu-jitsu Championships – Women's Black Belt Featherweight 2nd Place
 2000 World Brazilian jiu-jitsu Championships – Women's Black Belt Featherweight 1st Place
 2000 Brazilian National Jiu-Jitsu Championships – Women's Brown Belt Featherweight 1st Place
 2000 Rio de Janeiro State Jiu-Jitsu Championships – Women's Brown Belt Featherweight 1st Place
 1999 World Brazilian jiu-jitsu Championships – Women's Brown Belt Featherweight 3rd Place
 1999 Brazilian National Jiu-Jitsu Championships – Women's Brown Belt Featherweight 1st Place
 1999 Rio de Janeiro State Jiu-Jitsu Championships – Women's Brown Belt Featherweight 1st Place
 1998 Brazilian National Jiu-Jitsu Championships – Women's Purple Belt Featherweight 1st Place
 1998 Rio de Janeiro State Jiu-Jitsu Championships – Women's Purple Belt Featherweight 1st Place
 1997 Brazilian National Jiu-Jitsu Championships – Women's Purple Belt Featherweight 2nd Place
 1997 Rio de Janeiro State Jiu-Jitsu Championships – Women's Purple Belt Featherweight 1st Place
 1996 Rio de Janeiro State Jiu-Jitsu Championships – Women's Blue Belt Featherweight 1st Place
 1996 Brazilian National Jiu-Jitsu Championships – Women's Blue Belt Featherweight 1st Place

References

External links 
 Leticia Ribeiro Official Website
 Fit Athletic Club San Diego
 Gracie Tijuca Jiu-Jitsu Academy
 Gracie South Bay Academy

Living people
1979 births
Brazilian practitioners of Brazilian jiu-jitsu
People awarded a black belt in Brazilian jiu-jitsu
Female Brazilian jiu-jitsu practitioners
Sportspeople from Rio de Janeiro (city)
Sportspeople from San Diego
Brazilian jiu-jitsu world champions (women)
IBJJF Hall of Fame inductees